Ignacówka may refer to the following places:
Ignacówka, Masovian Voivodeship (east-central Poland)
Ignacówka, Sochaczew County in Masovian Voivodeship (east-central Poland)
Ignacówka, Świętokrzyskie Voivodeship (south-central Poland)